Automotive Dealership Institute is an Arizona-based and licensed training program that offers classroom and online instruction in management, finance, and insurance for the auto industry.

History
Automotive Dealership Institute (ADI) was founded in December 2004. The institute offers management training for automotive dealerships. Alan Algan is executive director, and Robert W. Serum is the Chancellor. ADI has received approval from the Arizona State Board for Private Post-Secondary Education, license number V1273 pursuant to the Arizona Educational Code. This approval means that the state regulators have determined and certified that an institution meets minimum standards established for integrity, financial stability and educational quality, including the offering of bona fide instruction by qualified faculty and the appropriate assessment of student achievement prior to, during, and at the conclusion of its course. Arizona State Board for Private Post secondary approval does not imply any endorsement or recommendation by the state or by the Board. All courses listed in the ADI catalog have received approval by the Board.

ADI has developed one of the most respected training courses in the automotive industry. This cutting-edge training is truly modern, comprehensive, highly effective, and tactical training course for success as an automotive finance and insurance manager, internet sales manager, desk/sales manager, or dealer representative. 

ADI is licensed, independent and a leading F&I school in the USA with over 32 years of experience as a leading automotive school, and arguably the best Automotive Finance and Insurance Management training program in the USA.

ADI is the author of Digital Edition of The Encyclopedia of Finance & Insurance Management.

School Chancellor 
Dr. Robert W. Serum serves ADI‘s management team as a trusted advisor to ensure the highest quality of education. Dr. Serum also assists with the continued development of ADI’s curriculum and the overall direction of the institution to preserve ADI‘s philosophy of maintaining the highest standard of education. Dr. Serum served as Vice President of Academics & International Programs at Northwood University until his retirement in 2007. During his 34 year tenure at Northwood University, Dr. Serum was the leader and coordinator of academic program content in all locations and for all programs. He also oversaw the start-up and accreditation of Northwood’s first MBA Program. In 1992, Dr. Serum became Vice President of Academics for the entire institution. He holds and A.B. In Business Administration from Hope College and an M.A. And Ph.D. From the University of Alabama. Dr. Serum is the recipient of the 2007 Automotive Education Excellence Award from Automotive Industry Education Foundation and the honorary doctor of laws from Northwood.

Automotive Finance Manager Training (F&I Manager Training) 
F&I refers to Finance and Insurance in the automotive industry, and the person performing this role is referred to as F&I Manager. A car dealership finance manager is a finance professional responsible for helping customers obtain the financing they need to purchase the vehicle of their choice.

Automotive Finance Manager or F&I Manager not only work directly with customers interested in a car loan, but they are also responsible for completing all of the required documentation for each financing transaction.

Examples of duties performed by car dealership finance managers include completing applications, pulling credit scores, filling out sales contracts, determining payoff amounts and performing title checks.

Car dealership finance managers also present and encourage the purchase of extra products sold by the dealership, such as vehicle purchase add-ons.

Each customer’s ability to obtain financing will depend on his or her likelihood of repayment as determined by income, credit score and other factors.

Automotive Dealership Institute for Veterans 
ADI offers an outstanding choice for Veterans who want to work in the field of F&I Management. For veterans can use the Post 9/11 GI Bill to help pay for their education, covering tuition for Finance and Insurance School that can be paid for with this bill. With the help of the Post 9/11 GI Bill, individuals can pay for the training they need at a qualified school of their choosing, such as the Automotive Dealership Institute.

Online F&I Training Courses 
In today’s automotive industry — where success is built upon outstanding customer service and well trained automotive personnel — education is undoubtedly recognized and appreciated as a key component. The truth is that just like in any other profession, training and education create success.

To service this need the Automotive Dealership Institute is offering an online F&I training platform to help individuals or companies bridge the gap of training. This program enables busy professionals to learn or sharpen skills without having to travel or take time off from work.

ADI’s online program is designed to maximize profit with an emphasis on maintaining the highest CSI with complete disclosures. Each section features interactive elements that use multimedia techniques, including filmed examples of real-life situations dealership managers face daily, voiceover, graphics, printable PDF textbooks and hands-on practice.

Digital Edition of The Encyclopedia of Finance & Insurance Management 
Encyclopedia of F&I Management includes:

 Easy PDF e-book download
 Electronic Table of Contents
 Easy to navigate bookmarks
 Great reference!

Some Highlights Include:

 Maximizing Profit
 Legal Compliance
 Deal Structuring
 Prime and Non-Prime Guidelines
 Credit Bureau Analysis
 Special Finance Set-Up
 Internet Department & e-Commerce
 Menu Presentation & Objection Handling

References

Automotive industry in the United States
Vocational education in the United States
2004 establishments in Arizona
Transport education